Andriy Andriyovych Cheremysin (born 23 April 1947 in Krasnodar) is a former Soviet football player and a Ukrainian football coach.

In 1980s Cheremysin supposedly played for some amateur club out of Simferopol. He also has two older brother and a son who all play football.

References

External links
 
 Cheremysin at ukr-football.org

1947 births
Living people
People from Krasnodar
Ukrainian football managers
Ukrainian Premier League managers
SC Tavriya Simferopol managers
FC Polissya Zhytomyr managers
PFC Spartak Nalchik players
SC Tavriya Simferopol players
FC Shakhtar Donetsk players
Soviet footballers

Association football midfielders